Hirakud Dam is built across the Mahanadi River, about  from Sambalpur in the state of Odisha in India. It is the longest earthen  dam in the world. It is one of the first major multipurpose river valley projects started after India's independence. Hirakud Reservoir was declared a Ramsar site on 12 October 2021.

Construction history
On 15 March 1946, Sir Hawthorne Lewis, the Governor of Odisha, laid the foundation stone of the Hirakud Dam. A project report was submitted to the government in June 1947. Pandit Jawaharlal Nehru laid the first batch of concrete on 12 April 1948.

In 1952, Mazumdar Committee was appointed by the government to oversee the soundness and technical feasibility of the project. The committee has envisaged costs of  92.80 crore for the project and that the construction of the main dam would be complete by June 1955. It also said that by 1954–55 a total of 
 would be irrigated and that 48,000 kW of electric power would be generated. However, the dam was completed in 1953 and was formally inaugurated by Prime Minister Jawaharlal Nehru on 13 January 1957. Power generation along with agricultural irrigation started in 1956, achieving full potential in 1966.

Technical details

Structure
The Hirakud Dam is a man-made structure of earth, concrete and masonry.  north of Sambalpur, it is the longest major earthen dam in the world, measuring  including dykes, and stands across the river Mahanadi.
The main dam has an overall length of  spanning between two hills; the Laxmidungri on the left and the Chandili Dunguri on the right. The dam and dykes together measure . There are two observation towers on the dam one at each side. One is "Gandhi Minar" and the other one is"Jawahar Minar". Both the observation towers present extensive views of the lake.

Power houses
The dam supports two different hydroelectric power houses. Power House I is located at the base (toe) of the main dam section and contains 3 x 37.5 MW Kaplan turbine and 2 x 24 MW Francis turbine generators for an installed capacity of 259.5 MW. It contains 3 x 24 MW generators. The entire installed capacity of the dam's power houses is 347.5 MW. Power House I and II were built in three stages. During stage I, four generators were installed at PH I and in stage II, the power channel two and Power House II was constructed. All three generators were installed at PH II along with two more at PH I by 1963. Between 1982 and 1990, the seventh and final generator was installed at PH I.

Purpose

In the upper drainage basin of the Mahanadi River, centered on the Chhattisgarh Plain, periodic droughts contrast with the situation in the lower delta region where floods may damage crops. The dam was constructed to help alleviate these problems by creating a reservoir and controlling river flow through the drainage system. The dam regulates the flow of the Mahanadi River and produces hydroelectricity through several hydroelectric plants.

The dam helps control floods in the Mahanadi delta and irrigates  of land. Hydroelectricity is also generated. The Hirakud Dam regulates  of Mahanadi's drainage.

The water released by the power plant irrigates another  of CCA  in Mahanadi delta.

Chiplima has gained prominence as the second hydroelectric project of the Hirakud Dam. The place is mostly inhabited by fishermen, whose deity Ghanteswari is revered in the neighboring area. The state livestock breeding farm and agricultural farm are located here.

Canal System
Hirakud Dam has three canals, namely Bargarh Main Canal, Sason Canal and Sambalpur Canal.

Industrial Use
Water from Hirakud Dam at a later stage was allocated to various industries, primarily for mineral processing and coal fired thermal power plants in Jharsuguda and Sambalpur districts.

Issues

Siltation
Statistics published by the dam authority show the water holding capacity of the dam has been reduced by 24% due to siltation.

Water Conflict
A major conflict for water was reported when over 30,000 farmers gathered around the dam making a human chain, protesting against the allocation of water to the industries and there being no water for the canal system due to a low water level.

Inter-basin Water Transfer
There have been plans for inter-basin water transfer, as per plans of the water resource dept of Odisha as part of India's ambitious Indian Rivers Inter-link.

Lost temples
These are remnants of temples submerged after the dam was completed in 1957. In the summer season, the receding water of the dam makes the structures become visible. The hidden treasures have finally caught the attention of historians, and steps are being taken to understand the historical significance of these temples, which periodically go under water, only to resurface again. Many temples have been destroyed after 58 years of underwater existence. However, some remain intact.

Interest in these lost temples has been rekindled after two stones, etched with writing ('Shila Lekha'), were recovered from what is believed to be the Padmaseni temple of submerged Padmapur village. The temples located inside the reservoir area were part of the then Padmapur, one of the oldest and most populous in the region prior to the dam construction. More than 200 temples were submerged by the dam, nearly 150 temples have either perished or are underwater and about 50 are visible during summer. The lost temples present excellent opportunities for scuba diving enthusiasts to explore the underbelly of Hirakud Dam. The temple are visible to visitors on boat only during the summer months of May and June.

Cattle Island

Cattle Island is located in one of the extreme points of Hirakud Reservoir, a natural wonder. Completely inhabited by wild animals, it is without any trace of humans. It can be reached by launch from Hirakud Dam, it is closer by  via the river. The island is a submerged hill, and before the construction of Hirakud Dam it was a developed village. During the resettlement period, villagers left some of their cattle behind; when the dam construction was over, the cattle settled on the hilltop. With the passage of time the nearby area filled up with the reservoir water, turning the hilltop into an island. Being away from mankind, the cattle are now wild, very swift and not easily caught. Living on a hilltop with dense forest, they are larger than tame cattle, and almost all are white in color. Nearby residents attempt to capture these animals from time to time, but these hunts are rarely successful. Though descended from tame cattle, these animals provide a contrasting picture of this breed of animal returning to life in the wild.

Wildlife

The dam with the channel provides an ideal environment for the wildlife. The Debrigarh wildlife sanctuary is located here. Several species of migratory birds visit the reservoir during winter. Nearly 20-25 species of birds are seen in the reservoir and common among them are common pochard, red-crested pochard, great crested grebe and several others.

People affected by the dam construction
The main purpose of the Hirakud Dam was to check the massive floods that were affecting a large part of coastal Odisha. But, the construction of the dam greatly affected the natives of the western part of Odisha. Nearly 150,000 people were affected by the Hirakud project and nearly 22,000 families were displaced.

A large number of families were evacuated from their hearth and homes without compensation from 1956 onwards.

Stamps and notes
A commemorative stamp on Hirakud Dam was released on 29 Oct 1979 by the Department of Posts, with denomination , 3,000,000 stamps issued. A hundred rupee note was issued on 26 December 1960 by RBI Governor H.V.R. Iyengar. On the back side of this note there are thirteen regional languages along with an image of the Hirakud Dam and Hydro-Electric station.

See also

 Hirakud
 2014 Hirakud boat disaster

References

http://www.hirakuddam.com/places-to-go/

External links
 Hirakud Dam
 Hirakud Dam On Wikimapia
 Hirakud dam of odisha

Hydroelectric power stations in Odisha
Dams in Odisha
Dams on the Mahanadi River
Geography of Odisha
Economy of Odisha
Buildings and structures in Sambalpur district
Tourist attractions in Sambalpur
Geography of Sambalpur
Dams completed in 1957
1957 establishments in Orissa
Ramsar sites in India
20th-century architecture in India
Islands of India
Populated places in India